Bilgachevo is a rural locality (a village) in Kharovskoye Rural Settlement, Kharovsky District, Vologda Oblast, Russia. The population was 48 as of 2002.

Geography 
Bilgachevo is located 5 km northwest of Kharovsk (the district's administrative centre) by road. Sitinsky is the nearest rural locality.

References 

Rural localities in Kharovsky District